The Datsuns is the debut album of the New Zealand hard rock band The Datsuns. It was released in 2002 and had three songs which had previously appeared on 7" singles: "Sittin' Pretty", "Fink For The Man" and "Lady".

A music video was produced for "In Love", which consists of a black and white concert footage of the song's performance. On the 2003 revival of Headbangers Ball, hosted by Metallica, drummer Lars Ulrich praised The Datsuns before playing "In Love".

Track listing
"Sittin' Pretty" 3:02
"MF From Hell" 3:34
"Lady" 2:56
"Harmonic Generator" 3:04
"What Would I Know" 5:35
"At Your Touch" 3:30
"Fink For The Man" 4:34
"In Love" 2:55
"You Build Me Up (To Bring Me Down)" 3:58
"Freeze Sucker" 6:01

Charts

References

2002 debut albums
The Datsuns albums
V2 Records albums